Bouveng is a Swedish surname, a form of  Walloon Bovin . Notable people with the surname include:

 David Bouveng (born 1973), Australian rugby league player
 Helena Bouveng (born 1962), Swedish politician
 Josefin Bouveng (born 2001), Swedish ice hockey player

See also
Bovin 
Bouvin 
Bowin (surname)
Boväng